The 2012 African Boxing Olympic Qualification Tournament was held in Casablanca, Morocco from April 29 to May 5.

Qualified athletes

Qualification summary

Results

Light flyweight

Flyweight

Bantamweight

Lightweight

Light welterweight

 Romaric Bassole of Burkina Faso originally won the bronze medal, but was disqualified after he tested positive for doping.

Welterweight

 Mohamed Diaby of Mali originally won the silver medal, but was disqualified after he tested positive for doping.

Middleweight

Light heavyweight

Heavyweight

Super heavyweight

See also
 Boxing at the 2012 Summer Olympics – Qualification

References

 Men's Light Fly 46-49kg
 Men's Fly 52kg
 Men's Bantam 56kg
 Men's Light 60kg
 Men's Light Welter 64kg
 Men's Welter 69kg
 Men's Middle 75kg
 Men's Light Heavy 81kg
 Men's Heavy 91kg
 Men's Super Heavy +91kg

External links
 AIBA

Olympic Qualification
Boxing Olympic Qual
Boxing Olympic Qual
Boxing in Morocco